"Best Night" is a song recorded by Australian hip hop dance and pop group Justice Crew. "Best Night" was released digitally and physically in Australia on 30 November 2012, as the group's seventh overall single and the second single from their debut studio album Live by the Words (2014). It peaked at number seven on the ARIA Singles Chart and was certified two times platinum by the Australian Recording Industry Association, denoting sales of 140,000 copies.

"Best Night" was nominated for ARIA Award for Song of the Year at the 2013 ARIA Music Awards. The Marc Furmie directed music video was nominated for Best Video.

Music video
The music video for "Best Night" was directed by Marc Furmie and released on 4 December 2012. It shows the boys partying and riding in a limousine. The video was nominated for Best Video at the 2013 ARIA Music Awards.

Track listing
Digital download
"Best Night" – 3:33

CD single
"Best Night" – 3:33
"Boom Boom" – 3:05
"Gonna Make You Sweat (Everybody Dance Now)" – 3:26
"Friday to Sunday" – 3:12

Charts
"Best Night" debuted at number 12 on the ARIA Singles Chart on 10 December 2012, and peaked at number 7 in its third week in the chart. It was certified two times platinum by the Australian Recording Industry Association for selling 140,000 copies. In New Zealand, the song debuted at number 39 on 14 January 2013, and peaked at number 24 the following week.

Weekly charts

Year-end charts

Certifications

Release history

References

2012 songs
2012 singles
Justice Crew songs
Sony Music Australia singles
Songs written by Big Sean
Songs written by Jared Cotter
Songs written by Khaled Rohaim